Holme Lacy is a village in the English county of Herefordshire. The population of the civil parish was 466 at the 2011 Census.

Category
It is a primarily rural village.

Etymology
Holme Lacy is not from Old Norse holmr "island" like other places of the name Holme, but from the fairly similar Old English hamm "land in a river-bend". The name was recorded as Hamme in the Domesday Book in 1086.

The name has varied through history; it has also been known as Homme Lacy (1396)  Hamlayce (1648), Humlachie (1701) and Hom Lacy (1836).

History
The town was an estate of the Bishop of Hereford and held by Roger de Lacy, which is where the "Lacy" affix comes from. De Lacy was a Lord of the manor, indicating that a feudal system was in existence during the Middle Ages.

William I of England had returned Hamme to Bishop Walter and in 1086 the total population included:
 16 villeins
 4 bordars (Villeins of the lowest rank who held a cottage at their lord's pleasure, for which they rendered menial service)
 1 reeve
 1 male and 2 female slaves
 1 priest
 and 1 Frenchman who between them had 20½ ploughs.

The priest shows there was a church at Holme Lacy. There were also two ploughs under the lordship's tenure in existence.

Police force
The village comes under the jurisdiction of the West Mercia Constabulary.

Holme Lacy House and its estate

Holme Lacy was for some centuries in the ancient family of Scudamore. Philip Scudamore settled here in the 14th century, and his descendant John Scudamore esq. was created a baronet in 1620, and in 1628 Baron Dromore and Viscount Scudamore, of Sligo. His successor, the second viscount, commissioned Anthony Deane in 1674 to build a new country mansion on the estate.

Holme Lacy House continued to be the principal seat of the family till the year 1716, when on the death of James, the 3rd and last Viscount Scudamore, the estate was vested in Frances Scudamore (born 1711-died 1750 in childbed), his only daughter and heiress. In 1729 Frances married Henry Somerset 3rd Duke of Beaufort, who in 1730 assumed the name and arms of Scudamore. Frances was divorced in 1744 and there were no children of the marriage.

Frances then married as her second husband Charles Fitzroy esq. He also assumed the name and arms of Scudamore, and had by her an only daughter and heiress, Frances (1750-1820). Frances married Charles Howard, 11th Duke of Norfolk to whom the property then in part descended, and, together with other valuable estates in this county and Gloucestershire, was added to the princely domain of the Howards.

The Duke and Duchess died without surviving children and after extensive litigation the Holme Lacy estate devolved in 1819 upon Capt. Sir Edwyn Francis Stanhope, Bart., R. N., who assumed the additional name and arms of Scudamore and whose son succeeded in 1883 as 9th Earl of Chesterfield.

The mansion of Holme Lacy built by the 2nd Viscount Scudamore remained, renovated in 1828-31 and again in the early 20th century, the family seat of the Earls of Chesterfield until 1902, when the contents were sold. In 1909 the house was sold to Sir Robert Lucas-Tooth, an Australian brewing millionaire. He sold it in 1924 to Noel Wills, on whose death in 1929 his widow  donated it to Herefordshire County Council. For some years it was used as a training college and psychiatric hospital. Several owners later it was leased to the Warner Leisure Hotels group.

A Grade I listed building, it is now a Warner Leisure Hotel.

Record pear tree
Perry pear trees can live to a great age, and can be fully productive for 250 years. They also grow to a considerable height and can have very large canopies; the largest recorded internationally at the time, a tree at Holme Lacy which still partly survives, covered three quarters of an acre and yielded a crop of 5–7 tons in 1790.

Railways
Holme Lacy was located on the Hereford to Ross-on-Wye section of the Hereford, Ross and Gloucester Railway. It was opened on 1 June 1855 as a  broad gauge line, it was amalgamated with the Great Western Railway in 1862. In 1869 the railway was converted to  standard gauge. The railway was closed to passengers on 2 November 1964.

See also
St Cuthbert's Church, Holme Lacy

References

External links

Holme Lacy House at Images of England
Holme Lacy House Hotel at Warnerbreaks
Photos of Holme Lacy and surrounding area on geograph
Herefordshire and Ludlow College Holme Lacy Campus

Villages in Herefordshire